Steve Ingram is an American special effects artist. He was nominated for an Academy Award in the category Best Visual Effects for the film Mulan.

Selected filmography 
 Mulan (2020; co-nominated with Sean Andrew Faden, Anders Langlands and Seth Maury)

References

External links 

Living people
Place of birth missing (living people)
Year of birth missing (living people)
Special effects people
Special effects coordinators